Nikolai Pavlov may refer to:

 Mykola Pavlov (born 1954), Ukrainian footballer and coach
 Nikolai Pavlov (Russian footballer) (born 1997), Russian football player
 Nikolai Pavlov (writer) (1803–1864), Russian writer